Mid and West Wales or Mid and South West Wales refers to an ambiguous region of Wales that is sometimes used, consisting broadly of the preserved counties of Dyfed and Powys, sometimes Swansea and sometimes parts of Gwynedd. It is also used sometimes as replacement for the regions of Mid Wales and South West Wales or West Wales in certain scenarios.

There is a Mid and West Wales Fire and Rescue Service and a Dyfed-Powys Police service.

There is also an electoral region for the Senedd with the same name (which is used, in parallel with the smaller constituencies, to elect top-up members under the Additional Member System). A European Parliament constituency existed from 1979 until 1999.

Other definitions of Mid and (South) West Wales

See also
 Mid and West Wales Fire and Rescue Service

References

Regions of Wales